Club Deportivo Los Yébenes San Bruno is a Spanish football club based in the neighborhood of Aluche, Latina District, Madrid. Founded in 1970, they play in Preferente de Madrid – Group 1, holding home matches at the Estadio Eustasio Casallo.

History
Founded in 1970, in its beginnings the club competed under the name of C.D. The Yebenes Aluche and at the end of the 80s joined the U.D. San Bruno, adopting the current name since then.

Stadium
The soccer field "Eustasio Casallo", is located in the park "Cerro Almodóvar" of the district, next to the Street Los Yébenes that gives name to the club. The field has an artificial grass surface, after the integral reform carried out in the summer of 2009 and completed in January 2010 with its reopening.

Season to season

 2 seasons in Tercera División

External links
 Official website 
 FFM profile 

Football clubs in Madrid
Association football clubs established in 1970
1968 establishments in Spain
Latina (Madrid)